The Travels of Jaimie McPheeters is a Pulitzer Prize-winning novel written by Robert Lewis Taylor, which was later made into a short-running television series on ABC from September 1963 through March 1964, featuring Kurt Russell as Jaimie, Dan O'Herlihy as his father, "Doc" Sardius McPheeters, and Michael Witney and Charles Bronson as the wagon masters, Buck Coulter and Linc Murdock, respectively.

Plot introduction
Taylor's realistic novel—despite the Tom-Sawyer-like protagonist and narrator, it is aimed at an adult audience and contains episodes that would have kept it off any school list at the time—was published in 1958 and won the Pulitzer Prize for Fiction the following year. In it, the young Jaimie (spelled with two "i"s) accompanies a wagon train headed from St. Louis, Missouri, to California after the 1849 Gold Rush.

Plot summary

The novel alternates between Jaimie describing his journey by wagon train and commentary by his father, a Scottish doctor with an effervescent personality whose judgment is often clouded by his weakness for gambling and strong drink.

The novel contains, in graphic detail, some intense Native American customs, especially rites of passage.

Publishing history
 Doubleday & Company. 1st edition. 1958. . (may also be: .)
 Pocket. 1960. Paperback. .
 Arbor House. 1985. Paperback. .
 Main Street Books. Paperback reissue edition. 544 pages. December 1, 1992. .
 Chivers Audio Books. Audio cassette. October 1993. .

External links
"The Guns of Diablo", 1964, Charles Bronson,  Kirk Russell, Susan Oliver
 IMDB entry for Jaimie McPheeters television series
 Photos of the first edition of The Travels of Jaimie McPheeters

Historical novels
1958 American novels
Pulitzer Prize for Fiction-winning works
Doubleday (publisher) books
American novels adapted into television shows